Albert Randolph Ross (October 26, 1868 – October 27, 1948) was an American architect.  Born in Westfield, Massachusetts, he was a son of architect John W. Ross.

Biography
Albert Ross attended grammar school in Westfield and later in Davenport, Iowa, where he went to high school, graduating in 1884. After working as a draughtsman in his father's architecture office in Davenport from 1884 to 1887, he spent a year working for an architect in Buffalo, New York, before joining the New York City firm of McKim, Mead and White in 1891. In 1898, he formed the firm of Ackerman & Ross with William S. Ackerman, a partnership which dissolved in 1901.

In 1927, when he was awarded a $10,000 prize in a competition to design a new courthouse for Milwaukee out of 33 who submitted proposals, he told the Milwaukee Journal why he settled on a traditional design:

In 1901, Ross married Susan Husted, from Brookline, Massachusetts. From 1901 until 1948 his main residence was on Negro Island, near Boothbay Harbor, Maine. He died October 27, 1948.

Principal architectural works

Among the buildings that Ross designed were 12 libraries. Some of his notable design projects included:

 Carnegie Library of Washington D.C., Washington, DC, an NRHP-listed work of Ackerman & Ross (1902).
 Carnegie Library, Atlanta, Georgia, by Ackerman & Ross (1902).
 Carnegie Laboratory of Engineering, Stevens Institute, Hoboken, New Jersey, by Ackerman & Ross (1902).
 Carnegie Library, San Diego, California, by Ackerman & Ross (1903; demolished 1952).
 Port Jervis Free Library, Port Jervis, New York, by Ackerman & Ross (1903).
 Carnegie Library, Atlantic City, New Jersey (1903).
 Taunton Public Library, Taunton, Massachusetts (1903).
 East Orange Public Library, East Orange, New Jersey, now the East Orange Municipal Court Building (1903).
 Nashville Main Library, Nashville, Tennessee (1904).
 Needham Public Library, Needham, Massachusetts (built 1904; demolished)
 Needham Free Public Library, Needham, Massachusetts (1904).
 Old Town Public Library, Old Town, Maine (1904).
 Gloversville Free Library, Gloversville, New York, Beaux Arts building listed on the National Register of Historic Places (1904).
 Pittsfield Public Library, Pittsfield, Maine; NRHP-listed for its architecture (1904).
 Union County Courthouse, Elizabeth, New Jersey as Ackerman & Ross (1905)."
 Public Library, Penn Yan, New York, (dedicated June 22, 1905).
 Cragin Memorial Library, Colchester, Connecticut (dedicated July 5, 1905).
 Uinta County Library, Evanston, Wyoming, now the Uinta County Museum (completed 1906).
 Pennsylvania Memorial, Vicksburg National Military Park, with Charles Albert Lopez, sculptor (dedicated March 24, 1906).
 Original portion of the Main Library of the Columbus Metropolitan Library system, Columbus, Ohio (dedicated April 4, 1907).
 Carnegie Library, Good Will Home Association, Hinckley, Maine (dedicated May 29, 1907).
 McKinley Memorial, Philadelphia, Pennsylvania, with Charles Albert Lopez and Isidore Konti, sculptors (dedicated June 6, 1908).
 Exterior design for Draper Hall, State University at Albany, Albany, New York (1909).
 Union Soldiers and Sailors Monument, Baltimore, designed by Ross with sculpture by Adolph Alexander Weinman (1909).
 Carnegie Library, Denver, Colorado; now the McNichols Civic Center Building (1910).
 Montclair Art Museum, Montclair, New Jersey (1914).
 Milwaukee County Courthouse, Milwaukee, Wisconsin (1931).

Gallery

References

19th-century American architects
1868 births
1948 deaths
Architects from New York City
Architects from Maine
People from Lincoln County, Maine
20th-century American architects
People from Westfield, Massachusetts